Robert or Bob(by) Stevens may refer to:

Business
 Robert J. Stevens (born 1951), American businessman, former chief executive officer of Lockheed Martin
 Robert L. Stevens (1787–1856), American shipbuilder and railroad executive
 Robert T. Stevens (1899–1983), American businessman and politician, Secretary of the Army, opposed Joseph McCarthy

Entertainment
 Robert Stevens, one of three pseudonyms for Robert Kellard (1915–1981), American actor
 Robert Stevens (director) (1920–1989), American film and television director
 Robert M. Stevens, cinematographer
 Bob Stevens (band), a Swedish dansband
 Bobby Stevens (singer) (born 1936), British singer also known by his real name Ray Pilgrim
 Bobby Stevens, member of the American R&B group Checkmates, Ltd.
 Robert Stevens (theater director) (1882–1963), theater actor and director

Law and politics
 Robert Stevens (lawyer) (1933–2021), academic at various American universities and Master of Pembroke College, Oxford
 Robert Stevens (jurist), professor of law at the University of Oxford
 Robert Stevens (Tennessee politician), American politician, Tennessee legislator
 Robert J. Stevens (born 1941/2), exonerated defendant associated with 2010 U. S. Supreme Court case United States v. Stevens 
 Robert S. Stevens (politician) (1824–1893), American politician, U.S. Representative from New York
 Robert S. Stevens (judge) (1916–2000), California politician, judge
 Robert T. Stevens (1899–1983), American businessman and politician, Secretary of the Army, opposed Joseph McCarthy

Sports
 Robert Stevens (baseball), 19th-century baseball player
 Robert Stevens (Australian footballer) (born 1951), Australian footballer
 Robert Stevens (cricketer, born 1777) (1777–1870), English cricketer
 Bob Stevens (basketball) (c. 1924 – 2012), American basketball coach
 Bob Stevens (golfer) (1928–2008), Australian amateur golfer
 Bob Stevens (sportscaster), sportscaster
 Bob Stevens (sportswriter) (1916–2002), American sportswriter
 Bobby Stevens (1907–2005), American baseball player

Others
Robert Stevens (priest) (1777–1870), Dean of Rochester, 1820–1870
 Robert David Stevens (born 1965), professor of computer science at the University of Manchester
 Robert Stevens (photo editor) (1938–2001), American photo editor, first fatality linked to the 2001 anthrax attacks
 Bobby Stevens, a main character in the CBS television series Smith 
 Robert Stevens (Royal Navy officer) (born 1948), British admiral

See also 
 Robert Stephens (disambiguation)